Pravin Darekar is an Indian politician from Maharashtra. He was a one term Member of the Maharashtra Legislative Assembly from the Magathane (Vidhan Sabha constituency) and now leader of Opposition in Maharashtra legislative council.

Maharashtra Legislative Assembly elections 2014
Pravin Darekar lost the Maharashtra Legislative Assembly elections 2014.

Early political life
Praveen Darekar was first elected to the Maharashtra Legislative Assembly on a Maharashtra Navnirman Sena ticket in 2009.

Maharashtra Navnirman Sena
Pravin Darekar was one of the driving forces along with Raj Thackeray to form the Maharashtra Navnirman Sena.

Joined Bharatiya Janata Party
After his loss in the 2014 Maharashtra Legislative Assembly election he left the Maharashtra Navnirman Sena to join the Bharatiya Janata Party.

Positions held
 Maharashtra Legislative Assembly MLA
 Terms in office: 2009–2014. 
 Member(elect) of Maharashtra Legislative Council 
 Terms in office:2016.
Leader of Opposition Maharashtra Legislative Council Incumbent

Controversy
He was booked in the rupees 123 crore Mumbai District Cooperative Bank scam.

References

Living people
Maharashtra MLAs 2009–2014
Maharashtra Navnirman Sena politicians
Bharatiya Janata Party politicians from Maharashtra
Marathi politicians
Year of birth missing (living people)